The Hôtel de Nevers was an aristocratic townhouse (hôtel particulier) in Paris, which was located on the right bank on the east side of the rue de Richelieu. It was previously part of Jules Mazarin's Palais Mazarin, but upon his death in 1661, the palace was divided among his heirs, and the western section along the rue de Richelieu became the Hôtel de Nevers. In 1721 it was incorporated into the Bibliothèque du Roi (Royal Library). With the growth of the library collections, the Hôtel de Nevers became inadequate for its purpose. Most of the original Hôtel de Nevers was obliterated in 1859, after Napoleon III asked the architect Henri Labrouste to remodel and extensively rebuild the entire site (now the Site Richelieu of the Bibliothèque Nationale de France). Only a remnant of the Hôtel de Nevers remains. It was declared a monument historique in 1975.

See also 
 Hôtel Tubeuf

References

Sources 
 Ayers, Andrew (2004). The Architecture of Paris. Stuttgart; London: Edition Axel Menges. .

Buildings and structures in the 2nd arrondissement of Paris
Nevers